Immortal, in comics, may refer to:

 Immortal (Image Comics), an Image Comics superhero character
 Immortal (webcomic), a 2006 webcomic by Dean Haspiel
 Immortal, a DC Comics character who appeared in Justice League International

It may also refer to:

 A Bedlam of Immortals, a French science fiction graphic novel
 Arion the Immortal. a series from DC Comics starring Arion, Lord of Atlantis
 Blade of the Immortal, a manga series from Hiroaki Samura
 The Immortal Hulk, a Marvel Comics superhero
 The Immortal Iron Fist, a Marvel Comics martial arts superhero series
 Immortal Man, a DC Comics superhero
 Immortalis, the name used by Mortigan Goth in the Marvel UK series Mortigan Goth: Immortalis
 Immortal Two, a 1997 series from Image Comics
 Immortal Weapons, a Marvel Comics spin-off group and mini-series from Iron Fist
 Mister Immortal, a Marvel Comics superhero
 The Immortal, A Guardian of the Globe from the comic and subsequent TV series Invincible

See also
Immortal (disambiguation)

References